Nikolai Anatolyevich Barkalov (born October 2, 1974) is a retired Russian professional footballer.

He made his debut in the Russian Premier League in 1995 for FC Torpedo Moscow.

Biography 
He started playing football at the Moscow football school. 

In 1992, he joined Torpedo Moscow and played for the backup team. In four years, he played 131 matches and scored 10 goals. He made his debut on July 8, 1995 with the main team in a major league match against Nizhny Novgorod Lokomotiv. He played two matches and left the team at the end of the 1995 season.

Since 2013, he has been working as a massage therapist for Spartak Moscow, first with Spartak-2, and since 2017 with the main team.

References

External links
  Profile at Footballfacts

1974 births
Footballers from Moscow
Living people
Russian footballers
FC Torpedo Moscow players
FC Torpedo-2 players
FC Moscow players
FC Khimki players
Russian Premier League players
Association football midfielders
FC FShM Torpedo Moscow players
People from Zelenograd